Benyapa Niphatsophon (born 26 June 1997) is a Thai professional golfer playing on the Ladies European Tour. As an amateur, she won a gold medal at the 2014 Asian Games in the women's team event with Budsabakorn Sukapan and Supamas Sangchan.

Amateur career 
Niphatsophon competed at the 2014 Asian Games in Incheon and won the first ever gold medal in golf for Thailand in the women's team event with Budsabakorn Sukapan and Supamas Sangchan.

Professional career 
Niphatsophon turned professional in 2015. In December 2015, she finished tied for 19th place at the final stage LPGA Qualifying Tournament to earn LPGA Membership for the 2016 season. On the 2016 LPGA Tour, she played 18 events and made eight cuts.

In 2017, Niphatsophon mainly played in the Symetra Tour. She finished second in five tournaments and was on the top of the money list at the end of the season. Her total Symetra Tour career prize money was $124,492 which made her become the third player in Symetra Tour history to surpass $100,000 in a single-season earnings. Niphatsophon was named 2017 Symetra Tour Player of the Year and secured the LPGA Tour card for the 2018 season.

In 2018, Niphatsophon played in 22 LPGA Tour events and made 10 cuts. She recorded her best LPGA Tour finish at the Cambia Portland Classic with a tied for sixth place. She missed most of the 2019 LPGA Tour season with a wrist injury.

Amateur wins 
2011 Truevisions International Junior, Enjoy Jakarta World Junior Class B, TGA-CAT Junior Ranking 2
2012 TrueVisions International Junior, Seletar Junior Open, Callaway Junior World Championship, Thailand Amateur Open, Albatross International Junior Girls Championship
2013 TGA-CAT Junior Championship (Asia Pacific), Seletar Junior Open, Santi Cup
2014 Bishops Gate Golf Academy Junior Classic

Source:

Professional wins (3)

All Thailand Golf Tour wins (2)
2014 Singha Classic (as an amateur)
2015 Singha Masters (as an amateur)

Thai LPGA Tour wins (1) 
2014 Singha-SAT Thai LPGA Championship (as an amateur)

Results in LPGA majors 
Results not in chronological order

CUT = missed the half-way cut
"T" = tied

References

External links 
 

 

Benyapa Niphatsophon
LPGA Tour golfers
Ladies European Tour golfers
Benyapa Niphatsophon
Asian Games medalists in golf
Medalists at the 2014 Asian Games
Golfers at the 2014 Asian Games
Benyapa Niphatsophon
Benyapa Niphatsophon
Southeast Asian Games medalists in golf
Competitors at the 2013 Southeast Asian Games
Competitors at the 2015 Southeast Asian Games
1997 births
Living people
Benyapa Niphatsophon
Benyapa Niphatsophon